Camera Shy is a Canadian comedy film, directed by Mark Sawers and released in 2012. The film stars Nicolas Wright as Larry Coyle, a Vancouver City Council member who endorses a waterfront casino proposal in exchange for the developer's assistance in supporting his own political ambitions to become a member of Parliament, only to then become aware that his every action is being followed by a cameraman that nobody else can see.

The film's cast also includes Gerard Plunkett, Crystal Balint, Hilary Jardine, Fred Keating, Ted Friend, Lara Gilchrist, Albert Trinh, Elizabeth Nguyen, Stephen Lobo, David Nykl, Michael St. John Smith, Sean Amsing, Yann Bernaquez, C. Ernst Harth, Sean Carey, Adrien Dorval and Stefano Giulianetti.

According to Sawers, the film was inspired by a desire to explore the concept of a film character who can see that he's being filmed.

The film premiered at the 2012 Vancouver International Film Festival.

The film was a Vancouver Film Critics Circle award nominee for Best British Columbia Film at the Vancouver Film Critics Circle Awards 2012. It won six Leo Awards in 2013, for Best Motion Picture, Best Director (Sawers), Best Supporting Actor (Plunkett), Best Screenwriting in a Feature Length Drama (Sawers, Doug Barber), Best Cinematography (Brian Johnson) and Best Musical Score (Don MacDonald).

References

External links
 

2012 films
2012 comedy films
Canadian political comedy films
English-language Canadian films
Films directed by Mark Sawers
Films set in Vancouver
Films shot in Vancouver
2010s English-language films
2010s Canadian films